The Alchemist is the third album from the Swedish doom metal band Witchcraft. The album was released in 2007 by Rise Above Records. The Japanese version (released on Leaf Hound Records) contains the bonus track "Sweet Honey Pie" by Roky Erickson, which originally appeared on Scandinavian Friends: A Tribute to Roky Erickson.

Track listing
"Walk Between the Lines" - 3:24
"If Crimson Was Your Colour" - 3:47
"Leva" - 4:33
"Hey Doctor" - 5:12
"Samaritan Burden" - 6:27
"Remembered" - 5:14
"The Alchemist (parts 1, 2 & 3)" - 14:38
"Sweet Honey Pie" (Erickson) - 3:00 (Japan-only bonus track)

Personnel

Witchcraft
 Magnus Pelander - vocals, electric guitar
 John Hoyles - electric and acoustic guitar
 Ola Henriksson - bass
 Fredrik Jansson - drums, percussion

Additional musicians
Tom Hakava - mellotron, wersi, upright piano, pump organ, and percussion
Anders Andersson - saxophone

Production
Produced, Engineered & Mixed By Tom Hakava
Mastered By Bjorn Engelmann at Cutting Room Studios

References

2007 albums
Witchcraft (band) albums
Rise Above Records albums